Turquoise was one of six s built for the French Navy in the first decade of the 20th century.

Design and description
The Émeraude class were built as part of the French Navy's 1903 building program to a Maugas single-hull design. The submarines displaced  surfaced and  submerged. Their crew numbered 2 officers and 23 enlisted men.

For surface running, the boats were powered by two Sautter-Harlé  diesel engines, each driving one propeller shaft. When submerged each propeller was driven by a 300-metric-horsepower electric motor.

The boats were armed with four internal  torpedo tubes, two in the bow and two in the stern, for which they carried six torpedoes. Turquoise and her sister  were the first French submarines to be equipped with a deck gun when they were fitted with a single  gun in August 1915.

Construction and career
Turquoise was laid down in October 1903 at the Arsenal de Toulon, launched on 3 August 1908 and commissioned on 10 December 1910.

During World War I, Turquoise was sunk in the Dardanelles off Nagara Point, Ottoman Empire, on 30 October 1915 by an artillery corporal named Müstecip while traveling on the surface. {The crew surrendered) She was refloated by Ottoman forces on 3 November 1915 and taken into the Ottoman Navy as Müstecip Onbaşı, and returned in 1918.

Citations

Bibliography
 
 
 
 
 
 

Émeraude-class submarine (1906)
World War I submarines of France
1908 ships
Maritime incidents in 1915
World War I shipwrecks in the Dardanelles
Lost submarines of France
Captured ships
Submarines of the Ottoman Navy